Aynikab (Dargwa: ГӀяйнихъяб) is a rural locality (a selo) in Verkhne-Ubekimakhinsky Selsoviet, Levashinsky District, Republic of Dagestan, Russia. The population was 103 as of 2010. There are 3 streets.

Geography 
Aynikab is located 30 km southwest of Levashi (the district's administrative centre) by road. Musultemakhi and Kumamakhi are the nearest rural localities.

Nationalities 
Dargins live there.

References 

Rural localities in Levashinsky District